Timpo Toys Ltd. was a British toy company created in 1938 by Salomon "Sally" Gawrylovitz (born in Frankfurt 1907, died September 28, 2000 in Zug, Switzerland), also known as Ally Gee.

History 

A Jewish refugee from Germany, Gawrylovitz started as Toy Importers Company known as TIMPO in 1938. The company manufactured various toys out of wood, bakelite and composition until the end of World War II.

Following the war, Timpo made hollowcast metal toy soldiers; with soldiers manufactured in plastic from 1954.

The firm ceased operations in 1978.

Timpo Toys series 

The assortment of Timpo Toys consisted of several figurine series, with the American frontier series and the Knight series forming the core of the product range. Since Timpo further developed the series in the course of production, some series could be divided into generations (e.g. there are four generations within the Cowboy series).

Overview of the series:
 American frontier series
 Cowboy series
 Native Americans und Apaches series
 Union Army series
 Confederate States Army series
 Mexican series
 Knight series
 Crusader series
 Medieval Knights series
 Vizor Knights series
 Gold Knights series
 Silver Knights series
 Black Knights series
 Other series
 Romans series
 Vikings series
 Arabs series
 French Foreign Legions series
 American Revolutionary War series
 Inuit series
 World War II series
 Farm series
 Guard series

Picture gallery 
The following pictures show examples for Timpo plastic figures.

References

Notes

Bibliography

Further reading 
 Plastic Warrior Special - Timpo, Plastic Warrior magazine (accessed 2019-02-04)
 

Toy companies of the United Kingdom
Model manufacturers of the United Kingdom
Toy brands
Toy soldier manufacturing companies